Ankersmit (also: Kok Ankersmit)  is the name of a Dutch patrician family from Wilp.

History 
The oldest known ancestor of the family is one Rutger Ankersmit who lived in Wilp in the 17th century. His great-grandson Hendrik Jan Ankersmit (1775-1850) moved to Deventer. His descendants became successful in the metal manufacture and textile industry. 
The name literally means "anchor smith."

Notable members
Frank Ankersmit, philosopher.
Thomas Ankersmit, musician.

Literature
Nederland's Patriciaat 79 (1995), p. 1-64.

Dutch patrician families